Nooshin Al Khadeer (born 13 February 1981) is an Indian former cricketer and current national coach of U-19 Women's Cricket team. She played as a right-arm off break bowler. She appeared in five Test matches, 78 One Day Internationals and two Twenty20 Internationals for India between 2002 and 2012. She played domestic cricket for Karnataka and Railways.

She is currently the coach of Railways. She was also head coach of Supernovas for the 2022 Women's T20 Challenge.

Career 
She made her debut in international cricket on 8 January 2002 in a One Day International against England. She was ranked No. 1 in the world in 2003. She took 100 wickets in ODIs.

References

External links
 
 

1981 births
Living people
Cricketers from Karnataka
Indian women cricketers
India women Test cricketers
India women One Day International cricketers
India women Twenty20 International cricketers
Karnataka women cricketers
Railways women cricketers
Central Zone women cricketers